The 2017 Copa do Brasil Third Round was played from 8 March to 5 April 2017, to decide the 10 teams advancing to the Fourth Round. In this year, each tie was played on a home-and-away two-legged basis. If tied on aggregate, the away goals rule would be used. If still tied, extra time would not be played, and the penalty shoot-out would be used to determine the winner. Hosting was determined by a draw.

Matches

|}

Match 61

Sport won 4–0 on aggregate and advanced to the fourth round.

Match 62

Joinville won 3–2 on aggregate and advanced to the fourth round.

Match 63

Cruzeiro won 5–0 on aggregate and advanced to the fourth round.

Match 64

Fluminense won 4–3 on aggregate and advanced to the fourth round.

Match 65

Internacional won 7–1 on aggregate and advanced to the fourth round.

Match 66

Corinthians won 3–1 on aggregate and advanced to the fourth round.

Match 67

Goiás won 5–1 on aggregate and advanced to the fourth round.

Match 68

Vitória won 2–1 on aggregate and advanced to the fourth round.

Match 69

Tied 0–0 on aggregate, Paraná won on penalties and advanced to the fourth round.

Match 70

São Paulo won 4–2 on aggregate and advanced to the fourth round.

References

2017 Copa do Brasil